The 1984 Men's World Weightlifting Championships were held in Los Angeles, United States from July 29 to August 8, 1984. There were 187 men in action from 48 nations.

This tournament was a part of 1984 Summer Olympics but counted as World Weightlifting Championships too. Only total medals counted for Olympic Games while Snatch and Clean & Jerk medals counts for World Weightlifting Championships. The Soviet-led boycott meant that the most dominant forces in weightlifting at the time, the USSR, Bulgaria and East Germany did not take part.

Medal summary

Medal table
Ranking by Big (Total result) medals 

Ranking by all medals: Big (Total result) and Small (Snatch and Clean & Jerk)

See also
 Weightlifting at the 1984 Summer Olympics

References
Results (Sport 123)
Weightlifting World Championships Seniors Statistics 

World Weightlifting Championships
World Weightlifting Championships
1984 in American sports
1984 in sports in California
International weightlifting competitions hosted by the United States